Łukasz Krawczuk (born 15 June 1989) is a Polish sprinter specialising in the 400 metres. He has won two medals in the 4 × 400 metres relay at the European Athletics Championships.

Career
Krawczuk represented his country in the 4 × 400 metres relay at the 2013 World Championships, as well as two indoor World Championships in 2012 and 2014. He won the bronze medal with the Polish relay team at the 2014 European Championships and silver at the 2015 European Indoor Championships.

His personal bests in the event are 45.65 seconds outdoors (Szczecin 2014) and 46.31 seconds indoors (Prague 2015).

Krawczuk and his teammates qualified to the 4 × 400 metres relay final at the 2016 Summer Olympics in Rio de Janeiro, Brazil.

The Polish quartet of Karol Zalewski, Rafał Omelko, Łukasz Krawczuk, Jakub Krzewina broke the world indoor record in the men's 4x400m with a stunning finish to the final track event of the 2018 World Indoor Championships in Birmingham. Krzewina overtook the leaders from the beginning - Americans on the last straight and achieved the greatest success in their career.

Competition record

References

External links 
 
 
 
 

1989 births
Living people
Polish male sprinters
People from Kłodzko
World Athletics Championships athletes for Poland
European Athletics Championships medalists
Athletes (track and field) at the 2016 Summer Olympics
Olympic athletes of Poland
World Athletics Indoor Championships winners
21st-century Polish people